The men's singles of the 2007 ECM Prague Open tournament was played on clay in Prague, Czech Republic.

Robin Vik was the defending champion, but lost in first round to Jan Hájek.

Dušan Lojda won the title by defeating Jiří Vaněk 6–7(3–7), 6–2, 7–6(7–5) in the final.

Seeds

Draw

Finals

Top half

Bottom half

External Links
 Main Draw
 Qualifying Draw

2007 Men's Singles